Khandaker Abdur Rashid is a Bangladesh Army officer and a fugitive assassin of the first president of Bangladesh, Sheikh Mujib.

Biography
Khandaker Abdur Rashid was born on 1946 in the district of Comilla, in British India. He served in the Pakistan army and defected during the start of Bangladesh Liberation war. Thus, he was a freedom fighter. Despite having a similarity in family name, the only relation between Rashid and Khandaker Moshtaque Ahmed was their common birth district. Khandaker Moshtaque Ahmed became the president of Bangladesh after the assassination of Sheikh Mujib. he was a major at the time of the 15 August 1975 coup and assassination of Sheikh Mujib. He was part of the team that raided the armory of the 2nd Field Artillery on 11:30 pm August 15 to use in the coup. He was maintaining contact with Moshtaque throughout the time. The conspirators held several meetings in his residence in Dhaka cantonment. He promoted to Lieutenant Colonel after the assassination. He returned to Dhaka during the regime of Hussain Mohammad Ershad. He formed Bangladesh Freedom Party with Syed Faruque Rahman. He was elected to parliament in the 15 February 1996 general election, which was discredited. Faruque was his brother in law.

He was convicted and sentenced to death in absentia for the assassination of Sheikh Mujib. He lives in Pakistan as of 2000. In 2016 the government of Bangladesh passed a law that allowed for the seizure of the properties of those convicted in the killing of Sheikh Mujib. Rashid's shares in Kushtia based Jubilee Bank were ordered to be seized by Bangladesh Bank. His daughter Mehnaz Rashid is leader of the Freedom Party and was arrested in 2009 by Bangladesh police.

References

Living people
Bangladeshi lieutenant colonels
Assassination of Sheikh Mujibur Rahman
People convicted of murder by Bangladesh
Year of birth missing (living people)
Bangladesh Freedom Party politicians
6th Jatiya Sangsad members
People from Comilla District